Aitor Ruibal García (born 22 March 1996) is a Spanish professional footballer who plays mainly as a right winger for La Liga club Real Betis.

Club career
Born in Sallent, Barcelona, Catalonia, Ruibal made his senior debut with CE Manresa in the 2012–13 campaign, in the regional leagues. In 2013 he moved to UE Cornellà, returning to youth football.

Ruibal featured in three first team matches for the side during the 2014–15 season, his first being on 21 December 2014 in a 1–0 Segunda División B home loss against CD Alcoyano. The following February he moved to fellow league team CE L'Hospitalet; initially playing with the Juvenil A squad, he was definitely promoted to the first team on 19 June 2015.

On 22 December 2015, Ruibal signed a one-and-a-half-year contract with Real Betis, being assigned to the reserves also in the third division. He made his first team – and La Liga – debut on 10 December 2017, coming on as a late substitute for Fabián in a 1–0 home loss against Atlético Madrid.

On 10 May 2018, Ruibal was loaned to third division side FC Cartagena until 30 June. On 13 July, he moved to Segunda División side CF Rayo Majadahonda, also in a temporary deal.

On 4 July 2019, Ruibal signed a new three-year deal with the Verdiblancos, being immediately loaned to fellow first division side CD Leganés for one year.

Career statistics

Club

Honours
Betis
Copa del Rey: 2021–22

References

External links
Profile at the Real Betis website

Beticopedia profile 

1996 births
Living people
People from Bages
Sportspeople from the Province of Barcelona
Spanish footballers
Footballers from Catalonia
Association football wingers
La Liga players
Segunda División B players
Tercera División players
Divisiones Regionales de Fútbol players
CE Manresa players
UE Cornellà players
CE L'Hospitalet players
Betis Deportivo Balompié footballers
Real Betis players
FC Cartagena footballers
CF Rayo Majadahonda players
CD Leganés players